The Compact platform was developed by engineers of the Fiat group for the construction of small family cars (compact cars) and large family cars (mid-size cars) with front-wheel drive or four-wheel drive. The first incarnation of this platform was the Alfa Romeo Giulietta which was unveiled in 2010. Fiat has invested 100 million euros into the construction of the Compact Platform.

Origin

Developed in Turin, Italy, the Compact platform was designed to adapt to future cars of both the Fiat and Chrysler group. Developed a new high-performance platform that uses only a front central part of the floor from the old C-platform. The frame composition is 84% high-strength steel (as opposed to the old C-platform, 65% of which was high-strength steel) and 4% aluminum, and magnesium.
The front suspension uses MacPherson Evo struts with aluminum uprights and is  lighter than the previous design with steel uprights (as used in the Fiat Bravo). The rear suspension uses an independent multi-link suspension and each of them consists of two lateral links with an aluminum longitudinal arm that mounts the hub and spring. Using aluminium rather than steel, which has a higher density, enabled a total combined weight-savings in the suspension bits of 14 kilograms.  The framework for the rear seats and the magnesium alloy cross member reduced weight by 35% in comparison to earlier cars.

The platform offers a compact transverse engine at the front with either front or four-wheel drive.

Long wheelbase version (Compact Wide)

The long wheelbase version is called Compact Wide and was used for US-built models of Chrysler sedans like the Dodge Dart and Chrysler 200. The CUSW products first appeared in late 2011. It was designed with additional features for a compact platform that could adapt to sports cars like Alfa Romeo.

The engine range, combined with the platform, consists of the compact four-cylinder petrol 1.4 Fire, 1.4 Multiair, 1.75 TBi turbocharged, the 2.0 or 2.4 Chrysler GEMA engine, the 3.2 or the 3.6 Chrysler Pentastar V6 engine, and the 1.6, 2.0 and 2.2 Multijet turbodiesel engines. Fiat and Chrysler planned to build about 1 million vehicles a year by 2014 based on this platform. Eight upcoming Chrysler Group vehicles are planned to be built on Fiat's Compact Wide platform, including the replacement for the Jeep Liberty.

Vehicles based on Fiat Compact platform
Compact:
 2010–2020 Alfa Romeo Giulietta
Compact Wide:
 2013-2017 Dodge Dart/Fiat Viaggio/Ottimo
Compact Wide LWB:
 2014-2017 Chrysler 200
 2017–present Chrysler Pacifica
 2020–present Chrysler Voyager
4X4:
 2014–Present Jeep Cherokee
 2018–2022 Jeep Grand Commander

References

C
C